Reidar Skotgård (18 November 1936 – 13 November 2019) was a Norwegian politician for the Conservative Party.

He served as a deputy representative to the Parliament of Norway from Akershus during the terms 1985–1989 and 1989–1993. In total he met during 63 days of parliamentary session. He served as mayor of Nittedal.

References

1936 births
2019 deaths
People from Nittedal
Deputy members of the Storting
Conservative Party (Norway) politicians
Mayors of places in Akershus